The 1940 UCLA Bruins football team represented the University of California, Los Angeles (UCLA) in the 1940 college football season. The Bruins offense scored 79 points while the defense allowed 174 points. Coached by Edwin C. Horrell, the Bruins finished the season with a 1–9 record.

Schedule

1940 Bruins in professional sports
The following players were claimed in the 1941 NFL Draft.

Jackie Robinson went on to a career in Major League Baseball.

References

UCLA
UCLA Bruins football seasons
UCLA Bruins football